Johann Hermann Wolfgang Mulzer  is a German organic chemist, best known for his work in total synthesis. Since 1996, he has been a professor of chemistry at the University of Vienna (Universität Wien).

Awards
1994 Gottfried Wilhelm Leibniz Prize
1997 Ernst Schering Prize
2010 Emil Fischer Medal.

Notes

References

1944 births
Living people
20th-century German chemists
Gottfried Wilhelm Leibniz Prize winners
21st-century German chemists
Academic staff of the University of Vienna